Shenick Island or Shenick's Island is an island that lies east of Skerries, County Dublin, Ireland. It is populated only by seals that harbour on the western side of the island and a few different species of seabirds nest there. It may be reached by boat but at low tide you can reach it by crossing a sand bank.

The most prominent feature on Shenick Island is a Martello tower. It is possible to climb into this with some effort. The martello tower is relatively intact however any wooden floors are long gone. The spiral staircase is still intact and access to the tower roof is possible.  The old cooking grate is still intact but the iron grate is heavily rusted. The tower is exactly 1 mile from the great windmill in Skerries and approximately 1 mile from the Monument on Strand Street and the Martello tower on Red Island. 

The Island had a population of four people in 1841.

Shenick Island can be reached most easily at Spring Tide

References

Islands of County Dublin
Uninhabited islands of Ireland